Euphaedra eupalus, the western blue-banded forester, is a butterfly in the family Nymphalidae. It is found in Guinea, Sierra Leone, Liberia, Ivory Coast, Ghana and Togo.

The habitat consists of wet forests. Adults are attracted to fallen fruit.

Description
 
Upperside: antennae black, lighter at the tips. Head black. Thorax and  abdomen dark brown. Anterior wings dark red brown, tipped with white; but next to the shoulders of a purplish hue, with a dark yellow streak near the tips, extending obliquely from the anterior towards the external edge. Posterior wings also red brown; but towards the middle and shoulders of a purplish blue, which they reflect more or less according to the position they are held in.

Under side: palpi and breast yellow. Anterior wings olive brown, tipped with white; but along the external edges of a hazel colour, and near the shoulders having three round black spots on each. Posterior wings similar to the anterior, being of a brown olive, variegated, and clouded, with three small spots placed near the shoulders, as in the superior ones. All the wings are a little dentated (tooth like).
Wingspan a little over  inches (90 mm).

Seitz E. eupalus F. is quite similar above to Euphaedra harpalyce but differs beneath in both wings or at least the hindwing having in the middle a curved transverse row of free white spots, usually bordered with black proximally. Sierra Leone to the Congo.

References

Butterflies described in 1781
eupalus
Descriptions from Illustrations of Exotic Entomology
Taxa named by Johan Christian Fabricius